Ariosoma kapala (common name - mottled conger) is an eel in the family Congridae (conger/garden eels). It was first described in 1990 by Peter H. J. Castle as Poeciloconger kapala. The holotype was collected by the New South Wales Fisheries Research Vessel Kapala on  April 11, 1985, during a bottom trawl at a depth of  46-64 m. The species was named for the FRV Kapala.  In 1998, Shieh-Chieh Shen moved the species to the genus Ariosoma.

It is a benthic species, endemic to the east coast of Australia and found in the neritic zone.

References

kapala
Fish described in 1990